Craig Ibbotson is a professional rugby league footballer who played in the 2000s. He played at club level for Stanley Rangers ARLFC, and Hunslet Hawks.

References

External links
Stanley Rangers ARLFC - Roll of Honour

Living people
English rugby league players
Hunslet R.L.F.C. players
Place of birth missing (living people)
Year of birth missing (living people)